Well studied Periodontal pathogens are bacteria that have been shown to significantly contribute to periodontitis.

Dental plaque, the precursor of periodontal disease, is a complex biofilm consisting mainly of bacteria, but also archaea, protozoa, fungi and viruses. Viruses that specifically infect bacteria - bacteriophages - are most common in the oral cavity.  Viral roles in the progression of periodontal disease as of 2017 remains poorly explored.

Although approximately 700 bacterial species have been identified in the oral cavity and nearly 300 species have been cultured and found to contribute to the biofilm of the periodontal pocket, there is a much smaller number of species that have been shown to be more closely related to the initial incidence and continued persistence of periodontitis, including:
 Aggregatibacter actinomycetemcomitans
 Porphyromonas gingivalis
 Tannerella forsythia (formerly Bacteroides forsythus)
 Treponema denticola
 Fusobacterium nucleatum
 Prevotella intermedia
 Prevotella nigrescens
 Eikenella corrodens
 Eubacterium nodatum
 Parvimonas micra (formerly Peptostreptococcus micros or Micromonas micros)
 Streptococcus intermedius
 Campylobacter rectus
 Capnocytophaga sp.

A number of types of fungi, especially Candida spp., also play a smaller but not insignificant role in periodontal disease.

Periodiontal disease and obesity initiation marker
 Selenomonas noxia

See also
 Red complex

References

Dentistry
Periodontology